The various FBI mnemonics (for electric motors) show the direction of the force on a conductor carrying a current in a magnetic field as predicted by Fleming's left hand rule for motors and Faraday's law of induction.

Other mnemonics exist that use a right hand rule for predicting resulting motion from a preexisting current and field.

Configuration, using the left hand

'FBI'

The left hand is held with the thumb, first finger and second finger mutually at right angles.

 The Thumb represents F - Thrust (or resulting Motion).
 The First finger represents B - Field.
 The Second finger represents I or V - Current (in the classical direction, from positive to negative).

Configuration, using the right hand
Other sources use the right hand to predict force, though the fingers used vary:

'FIB'
 Thumb = F ("thrust")
 Index finger = I or V
 Middle finger ("Birdie") = B

'IBF'

In this alternative, some versions recommend not extending the middle finger, but instead imagining the force coming from the palm of the hand.

 Thumb = I or V
 Index finger = B
 Middle finger = F

Other frequently confused rules

Prediction of direction of field ('B')

The rules above are usually used to predict 'F' based upon 'B' and 'I' - the force on a moving charge when moving through a field, whether or not the charge is carried in a wire. However, this rule should not be confused with a different right hand grip rule for the prediction of the direction of a field ('B') produced by current ('I') traveling through a wire.

Symmetry

External links
 Overview at ac.wwu.edu (Right Hand - 'FIB')
 Diagrams at magnet.fsu.edu. See figure #9. (Left Hand - 'FBI')
 Description at starprof.com (Right Hand - 'IBF' - palm alternative)

Science mnemonics
Electromagnetism